Mira-Sol is a railway station of the Ferrocarrils de la Generalitat de Catalunya (FGC) train system in the province of Barcelona, Catalonia, Spain. It is in the municipality Sant Cugat del Vallès, in the comarca of Vallès Occidental. It is serviced by FGC lines S1, and S7. The station is in fare zone 2C.

The station was opened in 1948 even though trains had already been passing through the station since 1918.

References

Stations on the Barcelona–Vallès Line
Transport in Sant Cugat del Vallès
Railway stations in Vallès Occidental
Railway stations in Spain opened in 1948